Tony Rivero is an American politician and a Republican member of the Arizona House of Representatives representing District 21 since January 5, 2015. In 2017 he was listed as the third most absent member of the Arizona House of Representatives. Rivero previously served on the Peoria, Arizona city council.

Early life and education
Rivero was born and grew up in Peoria, Arizona. He earned a Bachelor of Arts degree in secondary education, political Science, and history and a Master of Arts in political science from Arizona State University, as well as a Master of Public Administration from Northern Arizona University.

Elections
 2014 – Rivero and Rick Gray were unopposed in the Republican primary. Gray and Rivero defeated Esther Duran Lumm in the general election. Republican Bryan Hackbarth was removed from the ballot before the primary, while Helmuth Hack (L) withdrew from the race. Rivero received 27,826 votes.

References

External links
 Official page at the Arizona State Legislature
 
 Biography at Ballotpedia

Place of birth missing (living people)
Year of birth missing (living people)
Living people
Republican Party members of the Arizona House of Representatives
People from Peoria, Arizona
Arizona State University alumni
American politicians of Mexican descent
Hispanic and Latino American state legislators in Arizona
21st-century American politicians